Obukhovo is the name of several inhabited localities in Russia.

Ivanovo Oblast
As of 2010, one rural locality in Ivanovo Oblast bears this name:
Obukhovo, Ivanovo Oblast, a village in Verkhnelandekhovsky District

Kaliningrad Oblast
As of 2010, one rural locality in Kaliningrad Oblast bears this name:
Obukhovo, Kaliningrad Oblast, a settlement in Kovrovsky Rural Okrug of Zelenogradsky District

Kaluga Oblast
As of 2010, four rural localities in Kaluga Oblast bear this name:
Obukhovo (Dvortsy Rural Settlement), Dzerzhinsky District, Kaluga Oblast, a village in Dzerzhinsky District; municipally, a part of Dvortsy Rural Settlement of that district
Obukhovo (Ugorskaya Rural Settlement), Dzerzhinsky District, Kaluga Oblast, a village in Dzerzhinsky District; municipally, a part of Ugorskaya Rural Settlement of that district
Obukhovo, Medynsky District, Kaluga Oblast, a village in Medynsky District
Obukhovo, Ulyanovsky District, Kaluga Oblast, a village in Ulyanovsky District

Kirov Oblast
As of 2010, one rural locality in Kirov Oblast bears this name:
Obukhovo, Kirov Oblast, a selo in Obukhovsky Rural Okrug of Pizhansky District

Kostroma Oblast
As of 2010, two rural localities in Kostroma Oblast bear this name:
Obukhovo, Buysky District, Kostroma Oblast, a village in Tsentralnoye Settlement of Buysky District
Obukhovo, Vokhomsky District, Kostroma Oblast, a village in Belkovskoye Settlement of Vokhomsky District

Kurgan Oblast
As of 2010, one rural locality in Kurgan Oblast bears this name:
Obukhovo, Kurgan Oblast, a selo in Obukhovsky Selsoviet of Pritobolny District

Leningrad Oblast
As of 2010, one rural locality in Leningrad Oblast bears this name:
Obukhovo, Leningrad Oblast, a village in Staroladozhskoye Settlement Municipal Formation of Volkhovsky District

Moscow Oblast
As of 2010, six inhabited localities in Moscow Oblast bear this name:

Urban localities
Obukhovo, Noginsky District, Moscow Oblast, a work settlement in Noginsky District

Rural localities
Obukhovo, Naro-Fominsky District, Moscow Oblast, a village in Tashirovskoye Rural Settlement of Naro-Fominsky District
Obukhovo, Ramensky District, Moscow Oblast, a village in Gzhelskoye Rural Settlement of Ramensky District
Obukhovo, Shakhovskoy District, Moscow Oblast, a village in Stepankovskoye Rural Settlement of Shakhovskoy District
Obukhovo, Shatursky District, Moscow Oblast, a village in Radovitskoye Rural Settlement of Shatursky District
Obukhovo, Solnechnogorsky District, Moscow Oblast, a village in Krivtsovskoye Rural Settlement of Solnechnogorsky District

Nizhny Novgorod Oblast
As of 2010, two rural localities in Nizhny Novgorod Oblast bear this name:
Obukhovo, Gorodetsky District, Nizhny Novgorod Oblast, a village in Zinyakovsky Selsoviet of Gorodetsky District
Obukhovo, Pervomaysky District, Nizhny Novgorod Oblast, a selo in Petrovsky Selsoviet of Pervomaysky District

Orenburg Oblast
As of 2010, one rural locality in Orenburg Oblast bears this name:
Obukhovo, Orenburg Oblast, a settlement in Krasnogvardeysky Selsoviet of Buzuluksky District

Perm Krai
As of 2010, one rural locality in Perm Krai bears this name:
Obukhovo, Perm Krai, a village in Kungursky District

Pskov Oblast
As of 2010, one rural locality in Pskov Oblast bears this name:
Obukhovo, Pskov Oblast, a village in Nevelsky District

Ryazan Oblast
As of 2010, one rural locality in Ryazan Oblast bears this name:
Obukhovo, Ryazan Oblast, a village in Podbolotyevsky Rural Okrug of Pitelinsky District

Smolensk Oblast
As of 2010, three rural localities in Smolensk Oblast bear this name:
Obukhovo, Pochinkovsky District, Smolensk Oblast, a village in Muryginskoye Rural Settlement of Pochinkovsky District
Obukhovo, Safonovsky District, Smolensk Oblast, a village in Vadinskoye Rural Settlement of Safonovsky District
Obukhovo, Vyazemsky District, Smolensk Oblast, a village in Meshcherskoye Rural Settlement of Vyazemsky District

Republic of Tatarstan
As of 2010, one rural locality in the Republic of Tatarstan bears this name:
Obukhovo, Republic of Tatarstan, a village in Laishevsky District

Tula Oblast
As of 2010, one rural locality in Tula Oblast bears this name:
Obukhovo, Tula Oblast, a village in Solopensky Rural Okrug of Aleksinsky District

Tver Oblast
As of 2010, seven rural localities in Tver Oblast bear this name:
Obukhovo, Belsky District, Tver Oblast, a village in Belsky District
Obukhovo, Kalininsky District, Tver Oblast, a village in Kalininsky District
Obukhovo, Konakovsky District, Tver Oblast, a village in Konakovsky District
Obukhovo, Spirovsky District, Tver Oblast, a village in Spirovsky District
Obukhovo (Maslovskoye Rural Settlement), Torzhoksky District, Tver Oblast, a village in Torzhoksky District; municipally, a part of Maslovskoye Rural Settlement of that district
Obukhovo (Ladyinskoye Rural Settlement), Torzhoksky District, Tver Oblast, a village in Torzhoksky District; municipally, a part of Ladyinskoye Rural Settlement of that district
Obukhovo, Zharkovsky District, Tver Oblast, a village in Zharkovsky District

Vladimir Oblast
As of 2010, one rural locality in Vladimir Oblast bears this name:
Obukhovo, Vladimir Oblast, a village in Kolchuginsky District

Vologda Oblast
As of 2010, six rural localities in Vologda Oblast bear this name:
Obukhovo, Gryazovetsky District, Vologda Oblast, a village in Lezhsky Selsoviet of Gryazovetsky District
Obukhovo, Sheksninsky District, Vologda Oblast, a village in Nifantovsky Selsoviet of Sheksninsky District
Obukhovo, Ustyuzhensky District, Vologda Oblast, a village in Ustyuzhensky Selsoviet of Ustyuzhensky District
Obukhovo, Nesvoysky Selsoviet, Vologodsky District, Vologda Oblast, a village in Nesvoysky Selsoviet of Vologodsky District
Obukhovo, Semenkovsky Selsoviet, Vologodsky District, Vologda Oblast, a village in Semenkovsky Selsoviet of Vologodsky District
Obukhovo, Staroselsky Selsoviet, Vologodsky District, Vologda Oblast, a village in Staroselsky Selsoviet of Vologodsky District

Yaroslavl Oblast
As of 2010, six rural localities in Yaroslavl Oblast bear this name:
Obukhovo, Breytovsky District, Yaroslavl Oblast, a village in Ulyanovsky Rural Okrug of Breytovsky District
Obukhovo, Nekouzsky District, Yaroslavl Oblast, a village in Vereteysky Rural Okrug of Nekouzsky District
Obukhovo, Pervomaysky District, Yaroslavl Oblast, a village in Kozsky Rural Okrug of Pervomaysky District
Obukhovo, Kamennikovsky Rural Okrug, Rybinsky District, Yaroslavl Oblast, a village in Kamennikovsky Rural Okrug of Rybinsky District
Obukhovo, Pogorelsky Rural Okrug, Rybinsky District, Yaroslavl Oblast, a village in Pogorelsky Rural Okrug of Rybinsky District
Obukhovo, Yaroslavsky District, Yaroslavl Oblast, a village in Glebovsky Rural Okrug of Yaroslavsky District